Howard Burton Shipley (January 17, 1890 – February 22, 1976) was a multi-sport athlete and coach for the Maryland Terrapins at the University of Maryland. He is probably most remembered as the first and long-time head coach of the men's basketball team. He also coached the Maryland baseball team.

Shipley graduated from the Maryland Agricultural College (now the University of Maryland) in 1914. While there, he played basketball, baseball, and football as a quarterback. In 1923, he became the head coach for the Maryland basketball team, a position in which he served until 1947. During his tenure, he compiled a 243–199 record.

In 1917, Shipley served as the head football coach at Marshall University in Huntington, West Virginia. In December 1918, he was appointed athletic director and coach of football, basketball, and baseball at Delaware College—now known as the University of Delaware.

Also in 1923, Shipley was hired as an assistant coach for the football team under legendary Maryland head coach Curley Byrd. Shipley also coached the baseball team from 1924 to 1960.

Shipley Field, where the school's baseball team plays its home games, is named after him. In 1982, Shipley was inducted into the University of Maryland Athletic Hall of Fame.

Head coaching record

Football

References

External links
 Burton Shipley at Baseball-Reference
 
 H. Burton Shipley papers at the University of Maryland libraries

1890 births
1976 deaths
American football quarterbacks
American men's basketball players
Baseball players from Maryland
Basketball coaches from Maryland
Basketball players from Maryland
Delaware Fightin' Blue Hens athletic directors
Delaware Fightin' Blue Hens baseball coaches
Delaware Fightin' Blue Hens football coaches
Delaware Fightin' Blue Hens men's basketball coaches
Martinsburg Blue Sox players
Martinsburg Champs players
Martinsburg Mountaineers players
Maryland Terrapins baseball coaches
Maryland Terrapins baseball players
Maryland Terrapins football coaches
Maryland Terrapins football players
Maryland Terrapins men's basketball coaches
Maryland Terrapins men's basketball players
Marshall Thundering Herd football coaches
Marshall Thundering Herd baseball coaches
Marshall Thundering Herd athletic directors
Minor league baseball managers
Players of American football from Maryland
Sportspeople from Anne Arundel County, Maryland
United States Navy officers
Waynesboro Villagers players